Nagoya is Japan's fourth-largest city (after Tokyo, Yokohama and Osaka) and one of the nation's major economic centers. In terms of manufacturing, as home to automaking giants Toyota, Honda, Mitsubishi Motors, the city is the prime carmaker centre in the country. Other high-tech industries are also located there. The city also has the sixth most busiest train station in the country. The strong industry base is one of the major driving forces in continuing to build and expand large office spaces. Most skyscrapers are located in the downtown area of Meieki, close to the main train station.

Notable buildings 
The oldest skyscraper in the city is the International Center (Kokusai Senta), which was completed in 1984.

The tallest building in Nagoya is the 247-metre-tall (810 ft) Midland Square, which was completed in 2007. The city's second tallest building is the JR Central Office Tower that reaches 245 meter (804 ft) and was fully opened to the public in 2000.

The Mode Gakuen Spiral Towers, completed in 2008, is noteworthy for its unusual spiral architectural structure, and has established itself as a recognisable landmark.

The tentatively named "Nagoya Station New Building" started construction in 2012 and is due to be completed in 2016.

Tallest buildings
This includes spires and architectural details but does not include antenna masts.

Under construction
The following list shows buildings that are under construction in Nagoya and are planned to rise at least 100 metres (328 ft). Any buildings that have been topped out but are not completed are also included.

Proposed
The following list shows proposed buildings in Nagoya that are planned to rise at least 100 metres (328 ft).

See also
List of tallest structures in Japan

References

Nagoya